The Botryosphaeriaceae are a family of sac fungi (Ascomycetes), which is the type representative of the order Botryosphaeriales. According to a 2008 estimate, the family contains 26 genera and over 1500 species. Members of this order include notable plant pathogens.

Genera
This is a list of the genera in the Botryosphaeriaceae, based on a 2022 review and summary of fungal classification by Wijayawardene and colleagues. Following the genus name is the taxonomic authority (those who first circumscribed the genus; standardized author abbreviations are used), year of publication, and the number of species:
Alanphillipsia  – 5 spp.
Barriopsis  – 5 spp.
Botryobambusa  – 2 spp.
Botryosphaeria  – 9 spp.
Cophinforma  (2)
Dichomera 
Diplodia  – more than 1000 spp.
Dothiorella  – about 400 spp.
Endomelanconiopsis  – 3 spp.
Eutiarosporella  – 7 spp.
Lasiodiplodia  –37 spp.
Macrodothiorella 
Macrophoma  (310)
Macrophomina  – 4 spp.
Marasasiomyces  – 1 sp.
Mucoharknessia  – 2 spp.
Neodeightonia  – 8 spp.
Neofusicoccum  – 40 spp.
Neoscytalidium  – 1 sp.
Oblongocollomyces  – 1 sp.
Phaeobotryon  – 8 spp.
Sakireeta  – 1 sp.
Sardiniella  – 3 spp.
Septorioides  (5)
Sphaeropsis  – more than 600 spp.
Tiarosporella  – 2 spp.
Traversoa  – 1 sp.

References

 
Dothideomycetes families
Taxa named by Ferdinand Theissen
Taxa named by Hans Sydow
Taxa described in 1918